Peter Barnes (born 25 February 1955 in Enfield, London) is a British lighting designer, lighting director, show producer and set designer. He is credited with more than 150 designs for live music, film, television, dance, fashion, art and architecture.  He is known in the live music industry as 'the UK's guru of pop lighting'. He was the show producer, lighting and set designer for the Spice Girls live shows including the massive, international Spiceworld tour and the Christmas in Spiceworld tour. He designed the lighting for Live 8 and his design was used around the world for all major Live 8 venues with an estimated worldwide audience of 3 billion people. In 2000 he was voted Lighting Designer of the Year by Live! Magazine and was nominated Lighting Designer of the Year by Total Production magazine in 2008, 2009 and 2010

Personal life
Barnes lives with his partner Sue and has a daughter named Joanna. He lives in Cookham Dean, Berkshire, UK.

List of productions designed (selected)

Music

 Little Mix World Tour 2014-2019
 The Vamps (British band) Tour 2014- 2017
 Siouxsie Sioux Yoko Ono's Meltdown festival, Royal Festival Hall, London 2013
 Cheryl Cole Million Lights tour 2012
 Olly Murs tour 2012–2013
 JLS (2010)
 Capital Radio Summer Ball and Jingle Bell Ball (2008–2019)
 Girls Aloud (2006–2009, 2013)
 Boyzone (1995–1996, 2008–2011, 2013, 2016,2018)
 Wireless Festival (2006–2010)
 Westlife (2003–2008)
 X Factor tour (2005–2017)
 Ronan Keating (2003–2020)
 The Corrs (2004)
 S Club 7 (2001–2003)
 Blue (English band) (2002–2004)
 So Solid Crew (2001)
 Mark Knopfler (2001)
 Des'ree (1994–2000)
 Melanie C (1999–2000)
 Spice Girls (1997–2000)
 Kula Shaker (1997)
 East 17 (1994–1997)
 Sting (1994)
 Paul Simon (1993)
 EMF (1991–1992)
 Lisa Stansfield (1990–1997)
 Bros (1988–1989)
 The Cult (1988)
 Big Country (1983–1988)
 Magazine (1981)
 Motörhead (1980–1981)
 Siouxsie and the Banshees (1979–1983)
 James Brown (1978)
 Fats Domino (1977)
 Sutherland Brothers and Quiver (1976–1977)

Events
 Global Music Awards (2018-2020)
Oman National Day, Oman (2010)
 Laureus World Sports Awards, Russia and Abu Dhabi (2008–2011)
 McLaren Mercedes F1 launch, Spain (2007)
 Live 8 (2005)
 De Lovely film launch, Cannes Film Festival (2004)

Stage shows
 Diversity (dance troupe) (2010- 2019)
 Peter Kay (2010, 2011)
 Michael Flatley Celtic Tiger (2005)
 Michael Flatley Feet of Flames (2000)

Television and DVD
 Solidarity games,Opening and closing ceremony Baku 2017 
Meet The Parents ITV Series 2016
 Get Your Act Together ITV Series 2014
 MTV Brand New show 2014
 Goldfrapp cinema event live show 2014
 Derren Brown Live Channel 4 2014
 Imagine Dragons MTV EMA's 2013
 Stephen Lawrence Tribute BBC 2013
 Big Reunion ITV 2013, 2014
 Toto DVD 2013
 Only Connect, BBC2 (2008–2021)
 Chris Moyles Comedy Empire BBC 2012
 John Cleese DVD 2011
 Irish Music Awards, Ireland (2002–2009)
 Childline, Ireland (2002–2013)
 Celtic Thunder, Ireland, Canada & USA (2007–2010)
 David Broza Live at Masada, PBS (2007)
 Lionel Richie (2007)
 Celtic Woman (2006)
 The Secret Policeman's Ball UK (2006)
 CD:UK, ITV (2004–2005)
 Madonna, DVD (2006)
 Beyoncé, DVD (2004)
 Will Young and Gareth Gates, DVD (2002)
 David Gray, DVD (2002)
 The Royal Variety Show, BBC (1996)
 Top of the Pops Special, BBC (1997)
 Smash Hits, BBC (1992–1996)

References

External links 
 Interview with Peter Barnes about Live 8 at Live Design Online
 "Interview with Peter Barnes about Live 8" at Light and Sound International Online
 "Oman National Day 2010 video"
 "Internet Movie Database for Peter Barnes"

Lighting designers
English scenic designers
Living people
1955 births
People from Enfield, London